Ralph Blakelock may refer to:

 Ralph Albert Blakelock (1847–1919), American romanticist painter
 Ralph Anthony Blakelock (1915–1963), British botanist
 Ralph Blakelock (priest) (1803–1892), English archdeacon of Norfolk